Alfie Bass (born Abraham Basalinsky, 10 April 1916 – 16 July 1987) was an English actor. He was born in Bethnal Green, London, the youngest in a Jewish family with ten children; his parents had left Russia many years before he was born. He appeared in a variety of stage, film, television and radio productions throughout his career.

Personal life
Alfie Bass was born Abraham Basalinsky in Bethnal Green in London's East End. He was the youngest of ten children of Jacob Basalinsky, who had fled Jewish persecution in Russia, and his wife, Ada Miller. After leaving school, he worked in his father's trade as a cabinet-maker. During this time he took part in amateur dramatics at a local boys' club. He was active in the labour movement and often attended union meetings. In 1936 he took part in the Battle of Cable Street, in which activists attempted to prevent a march through the East End by the British Union of Fascists.

At the outbreak of World War II, he was rejected by the RAF, and went to work in an engineering factory. He was later called up into the Middlesex Regiment as a despatch rider. He maintained his interest in acting by appearing in concert parties and in Army Film Unit documentaries.

In 1946, he married  Beryl Bryson, a dressmaker, in Liverpool. They had a son and a daughter.

Stage career
Bass's acting career began at London's Unity Theatre in the late 1930s, appearing in Plant in the Sun alongside Paul Robeson, and as the pantomime King in Babes In the Wood.

His stage career included plays by Shakespeare and Shaw. During the 1950s, he continued to direct shows at Unity, and on one occasion appeared in court (along with Vida Hope), charged with putting on a play without a licence. His stage work also included an adaptation of Gogol's short story The Bespoke Overcoat, transposed to the East End of London, which was filmed by Jack Clayton in 1956, and won the Oscar for Best Short. In addition, Bass took over from Chaim Topol in the role of Tevye in Fiddler on the Roof on the West End stage.

Film career
Bass first appeared on film in wartime documentaries. He also appeared in a number of feature films including The Lavender Hill Mob (1951), Hell Drivers (1957), A Tale of Two Cities (1958) and Alfie (1966) starring Michael Caine and Shelley Winters. In the latter he played Harry Clamacraft, a man Alfie meets and befriends in a sanatorium.

He starred in Roman Polanski's vampire film The Fearless Vampire Killers (1967) (British title The Dance of the Vampires) as innkeeper Yoine Shagal with his daughter Sarah played by Sharon Tate. In the course of the film, he and his daughter become vampires. When a maid tries to scare him off with a crucifix, he responds with "Oy, have you got the wrong vampire!".

Bass also appeared in the "Pride" segment of The Magnificent Seven Deadly Sins (1971) and had a leading role in the 1977 sex comedy Come Play with Me. He has had many cameo roles, such as the Indian restaurant doorman in the Beatles' film Help! (1965), as Clouseau's seafaring informant in Revenge of the Pink Panther (1978), and in Moonraker (1979), in which he was cast as a heavy smoking hard drinker. Bass had a small part in I Was Monty's Double as a non-speaking passenger on a train.

In his book British Film Character Actors (1982), Terence Pettigrew remembers, "there was a time when no British film seemed complete without Alfie Bass popping up in some guise or other. Basically playing the same character, he has hopped chirpily from drama to comedy and into costume pieces and back like an energised sparrow. To all of these, he has added an engaging warmth and sanguinity".

Television and radio
Bass appeared as a poacher rescued by Robin Hood in the first episode of The Adventures of Robin Hood starring Richard Greene, in episode 2 "The Moneylender", as well as in episode 10 of the first series which was titled "The Ordeal". He also appeared in two later episodes during season two titled "The Goldmaker" (episode 5) and "The Goldmaker's Return" (episode 22) as Lepidus, the roguish alchemist, rescued from the Sheriff by Little John (Archie Duncan). He appeared in The Army Game (1957–61), a British TV comedy series, as Private Montague 'Excused Boots' Bisley, and its sequel Bootsie and Snudge from 1960–63 (there was also a one series revival in colour in 1974), working at a Gentlemen's club with Bill Fraser as 'Claude Snudge' and Clive Dunn as 'Henry Beerbohm Johnson'. Bass additionally played the character in another spin-off, Foreign Affairs, in 1964. Bass also played Lemuel "Lemmy" Barnet in the third and fourth series of the landmark 1950s science fiction BBC Radio series Journey into Space.

He continued working throughout the 1970s and 80s, particularly in the TV series' Till Death Us Do Part and Are You Being Served?, the latter as Mr. Goldberg, the second in a series of replacements for Arthur Brough's Mr. Grainger character (the first being James Hayter's Mr. Tebbs). As in the Mr. Goldberg role, he often emphasised his Jewish background in his on-screen characterisations.

Bass played a memorable Silas Wegg in the BBC's 1976 adaptation of Dickens's Our Mutual Friend. He also played Isaac Rag in a notable recurring character role in the 1979-1980 Dick Turpin series, and Morrie Levin, a shrewd accountant, in the Minder episode The Son Also Rises (1982).

Bass appeared in a 1979 episode of the ITV drama series Danger UXB: Just Like a Woman, as a family man with an unexploded bomb in his back garden.

He also guest starred in two episodes of the British comedy television The Goodies, in which he appeared as the "Town Planner" in Camelot, and as the "Giant" in The Goodies and the Beanstalk.

He was a subject of the television programme This Is Your Life in March 1970, when he was surprised by Eamonn Andrews.

Recording career

In 1955, Bass recorded the novelty song "Pity the Downtrodden Landlord". It was issued by the folk music label Topic Records on a 78rpm single, backed with "Housing Repairs And Rents Act", written by Fred Dallas; on both sides, Bass was accompanied by "The Four Bailiffs".

With his fellow cast members from The Army Game, Bernard Bresslaw, Leslie Fyson and Michael Medwin, Bass was part of a vocal quartet who scored a number 5 hit in the UK Singles Chart in 1958 with "The Signature Tune Of The Army Game". It was backed with the same actors singing "What Do We Do In The Army". In 1960, Pye Records issued two solo recordings by Bass on a single, "Villikens And His Dinah" and "Rat Catcher's Daughter".

Death
Alfie Bass died on 16 July 1987 in Barnet General Hospital, north London, following a heart attack. He was survived by his wife and their son and daughter. His last home was in Well End, a suburb of Borehamwood, Hertfordshire.

Selected filmography

 The Bells Go Down (1943) – (uncredited)
 Johnny Frenchman (1945) – Corporal
 Brief Encounter (1945) – Waiter at the Royal (uncredited)
 Holiday Camp  (1947) – Redcoat
 Jassy (1947) – Witness (uncredited)
 It Always Rains on Sunday (1947) – Dicey
 Vice Versa (1948) – 1st Urchin
 The Monkey's Paw (1948) – Speedway Track Manager
 Man on the Run (1949) – Bert the Barge Mate
 The Hasty Heart (1949) – Orderly
 Boys in Brown (1949) – 'Basher' Walker
 Stage Fright (1950) – Stage Hand With Microphone (uncredited)
 Pool of London (1951) – Alf, a henchman
 Talk of a Million (1951) – Lorcan
 The Galloping Major (1951) – Charlie – the newsboy
 The Lavender Hill Mob (1951) – Shorty
 High Treason (1951) – Albert Brewer (uncredited)
 Brandy for the Parson (1952) – Dallyn
 Treasure Hunt (1952) – Tipster (uncredited)
 Derby Day (1952) – Spider Wilkes
 The Planter's Wife (1952) – Soldier (uncredited)
 Made in Heaven (1952) – Bert Jenkins
 Top of the Form (1953) – Artie Jones
 The Square Ring (1953) – Frank Forbes
 Murder by Proxy (1954) – Ernie
 Time Is My Enemy (1954) – Ernie Gordon
 The Angel Who Pawned Her Harp (1954) – Lennox
 The Passing Stranger (1954) – Harry
 To Dorothy a Son (1954) – Cab Driver
 Svengali (1954) – Carrell
 The Night My Number Came Up (1955) – The Soldier
 The Ship That Died of Shame (1955) – Sailor on 1087 (uncredited)
 A Kid for Two Farthings (1955) – Alf the Bird Man (uncredited)
 Make Me an Offer (1955) – Fred Frames
 King's Rhapsody (1955) – Man in Crowd (uncredited)
 Jumping for Joy (1956) – Blagg
 Behind the Headlines (1956) – Sammy
 Child in the House (1956) – Ticket Collector
 Sailor Beware! (1956) – Organist (uncredited)
 A Touch of the Sun (1956) – May
 The Bespoke Overcoat - Fender
 No Road Back (1957) – Rudge Harvey
 Carry On Admiral (1957) – Orderly (uncredited)
 Hell Drivers (1957) – Tinker
 A Tale of Two Cities (1958) – Jerry Cruncher
 I Was Monty's Double (1958) – The Small Man
 I Only Arsked! (1958) – Excused Boots Bisley
 The Millionairess (1960) – Fish Curer
 Help! (1965) – Doorman
 Bindle (One of Them Days) (1966) – Joseph Bindle
 Doctor in Clover (1966) – Fleming
 Alfie (1966) – Harry
 The Sandwich Man (1966) – Yachtsman
 A Funny Thing Happened on the Way to the Forum (1966) – Gatekeeper
 A Challenge for Robin Hood (1967) – Pie Merchant
 The Fearless Vampire Killers (1967) – Shagal, the Inn-Keeper
 Up the Junction (1968) – Charlie
 The Fixer (1968) – Potseikin (uncredited)
 The Magnificent Seven Deadly Sins (1971) – Mr. Spencer (segment "Pride")
 Come Play with Me (1977) – Kelly / Luigi
 Revenge of the Pink Panther (1978) – Fernet
 Moonraker (1979) – consumptive Italian
 High Rise Donkey'' (1980) – Donkey Derby photographer

Footnotes

External links

1916 births
1987 deaths
English people of Russian-Jewish descent
English male stage actors
English male television actors
Jewish English male actors
People from Bethnal Green
20th-century English male actors
British novelty song performers
Male actors from London
British male comedy actors
British Army personnel of World War II
Middlesex Regiment soldiers